Dirty Martini may refer to:
 Dirty Martini (band), an indie-pop band from Portland, Oregon
 Dirty Martini (burlesque), New York City-based burlesque dancer
A type of Martini (cocktail)